Amit Chavda is an Indian politician from the state Gujarat, India. He belongs to Indian National Congress and also a member of Gujarat Legislative Assembly elected from Anklav assembly constituency.

Political career
Amit Chavda was born in Anklav of Anand district and since early days of his life he was active in political and social activities. He was active in NSUI and later in Indian Youth Congress. In 2004 & 2007 he got elected to Gujarat Assembly from Borsad assembly constituency and later in 2012, 2017 and 2022 he was elected from Anklav assembly constituency.  He was appointed as Gujarat Pradesh Congress Committee president in 2018. He was one of the youngest president of Gujarat Pradesh Congress Committee. In 2023 he was appointed as Congress legislative party leader of Gujarat.

Positions held

MLA from Borsad Constituency in 2004 
MLA from Borsad Constituency in 2007
MLA from Anklav Constituency in 2012
MLA from Anklav Constituency in 2017
Updandak, CLP, Gujarat Legislative Assembly 2012 to 2017.
Dandak, CLP, Gujarat Legislative Assembly 2017.
Appointed member in various committees of Gujarat assembly, like OBC, Estimate, PSUs etc.

Party posts

President, Anand District Youth Congress (1999 to 2004).
Pradesh Delegate, Gujarat Pradesh Congress Committee.
Executive Member, Gujarat Pradesh Congress Committee.
Worked as Co-Ordinator Central Zone with AICC Secretary, Assembly Election-2017.
Currently serving as State President, Gujarat Pradesh Congress Committee

Social & Cooperative Sectors

Secretary - Roshtriya Kelvani Mandal, Borsad.
It runs various Aashram Shala, Uttar Buniyadi Schools, Girls Schools, Gram Vidhyapith,
Industrial Training Institute and Computer Centres.

Secretary - Rashtriya Vidhyarthi Sahayak Mandal, Borsad.
It provides all study materials and hostels to the students and also runs various educational programs.

President - Jivan Chetna Kelvani Trust, Vadodara.
This trust runs various balwadi, Primary School, Secondary School & Higher Secondary School.

Managing Trustee - Navsarjan Education and Charitable Trust, Vadodara.
The trust is involved in various youth development, environment and health awareness programs.

Chairman, APMC Anklav (3rd Term).
Director, KDCC Bank, Nadiad (3rd Term).
Director, Anand District Co-Operative Sangh (3rd Term).
Director, Anklav,  Kharid Vechan Sangh.
Director, Gujarat State Co-Operative Bank Ltd., Ahmedabad.

Awards
Awarded as Adarsh Yuva Vidhayak by the 61 Bhartiya Chhatra Sansad, Pune.

References

External links 

Living people
1977 births
Indian National Congress politicians from Gujarat